The following lists events that happened in 1989 in Libya.

Incumbents
 President: Muammar al-Gaddafi
 Prime Minister: Umar Mustafa al-Muntasir

Births
 20 March - Mohammad Za'abia.
 21 April - Ahmed Krawa'a.
 5 May - Ghada Ali.
 3 November - Hamed Snousi.
 15 December - Marwan Mabrouk.

 
Years of the 20th century in Libya
Libya
Libya
1980s in Libya